Though small in absolute diversity, the Nemoriini are nonetheless among the larger tribes of geometer moths in the subfamily Geometrinae.

Selected genera
Some other geometrine genera still remain unassigned to a tribe, and a few of those might also belong to the list below.
Chlorosea
Dichorda
Nemoria
Ochrognesia
Phrudocentra

Footnotes

References
  (2008): Family group names in Geometridae. Retrieved 2008-JUL-22.
  (2007): Markku Savela's Lepidoptera and some other life forms: Geometrinae. Version of 2007-FEB-02. Retrieved 2008-JUL-07.

Geometrinae